title   full name   

f Dhallywood in 1994. as a box-office hit.

Plot
Lokhman, his wife and their son Sujan live with his step mother, step brother Solaiman and his pregnant wife whom Lokhman and his wife detest. However, the step family regards them as their own and his step mother and Solaiman love Sujan a lot. Lokhman and his wife later throw them out of his house with Solaiman giving his wealth share to Sujan. Solaiman and his family start their new life however, his wife dies after giving birth to their daughter Sakhi which heartbreaks him more. Years later, Sujan and Sakhi fall in love and vow to reunite their family. But Lokhman and his wife don't take this well to the point that Solaiman and his mother also try to break them up by locking them in their house. Sujan and Sakhi then try to elope. Solaiman saves them from being killed by a train which Lokhman highly appreciates and ends the feud. He then brings him and his mother to his house and after lots of difficulty, his wife also apologizes to her. Sujan and Sakhi are then married and everyone lives happily ever after.

Cast
 Salman Shah as Sujon
 Mithu as young Sujon
 Shabnur as Sokhi
 Raisul Islam Asad as Solaiman, Sokhi's father
 Anwara Begum as Solaiman's mother
 Sadek Bachchu as Lokman, Sujon's father
 Rina Khan as Sujon's mother
 Sharmin as Solaiman's wife
 Akhi as Kusum
 Ninad
 Shamsuddin Kayes
 Siraj Haider
 Syed Akhter Ali
 Zamilur Rahman Saka
 Sanowar Morshed
 Amir Hossain Babu

Soundtrack 
All music were composed by Abu Taher and lyrics were penned by Khan Ataur Rahman.

References

1994 films
Bengali-language Bangladeshi films
1990s Bengali-language films
Films whose writer won the Best Screenplay National Film Award (Bangladesh)

Films scored by Anupam Dutta